Fubine Monferrato (Fibin-ni in local dialect) is a comune (municipality) in the Province of Alessandria in the Italian region Piedmont, located about  east of Turin and about  northwest of Alessandria.

Fubine Monferrato borders the following municipalities: Altavilla Monferrato, Felizzano, Quargnento, Lu e Cuccaro Monferrato  and Vignale Monferrato.

People
 Luigi Longo (1900–1980), Italian politician

Twin towns
 Sokponta, Benin

References

Cities and towns in Piedmont